Leonore (Ella) Sophie Winter Steffens Stewart (1898–1980) was an Australian-British journalist and activist.

Early life 
She was born in 1898 to Freda Lust and Adolph Wertheimer in Nuremberg, Germany. Her parents were Freda Lust and Adolph Wertheimer from Nuremberg (Nürnberg) in Germany, who lived in London, Melbourne, Australia and again in London, when they changed their name to Winter (around 1910). 

In 1924 she married Lincoln Steffens after which she then had a son and moved to the largest art colony on the Pacific Coast, Carmel-by-the-Sea, California. Their children Rudolph, Rosa and Eleanora (Ella) were born in Melbourne. Fredric Wertham was a relative. She studied at the London School of Economics in England.

Career

The Steffenses were instrumental in helping to create The Carmelite, a new local paper. The Carmelite made a name for its alternative view on art and soon became one of California's most controversial publications. Within the paper, Ella wrote on various topics. She and her family were also involved in controversial national campaigns, including the Scottsboro Boys Defense Fund which sought to free nine black men who were still incarcerated after the Supreme Court of the United States reversed their convictions for rape twice.

She met the U.S. journalist and muckraker Lincoln Steffens at the Versailles Conference, where she was secretary to US Supreme Court Justice Felix Frankfurter. Winter and Steffens married in 1924. They moved to Italy, where their son, Peter, was born in San Remo. Two years later, they moved to the largest art colony on the Pacific Coast, Carmel-by-the-Sea, California. Where their social circle included photographer Edward Weston, poet Robinson Jeffers, philosopher/mythologist Joseph Campbell, nutritionist/author Adelle Davis, short story writer/poet Clark Ashton Smith, marine biologist/ecologist Ed Ricketts, Nobel prize winner Sinclair Lewis, and novelists John Steinbeck and Henry Miller.

The creation of The Carmelite 

Carmel Colony was sharply divided between conservative and liberal factions; the latter quickly coalesced around the Steffenses, who publicly debated the most controversial topics.  The Irish poet and folklorist Ella Young, as well as the local press, described the relaxed social intercourse in this counterculture world.  In 1928 the Steffenses helped to create The Carmelite, a publication that was offered as an alternative to the town’s somewhat stodgy local paper, the Carmel Pine Cone.  With contributions by numerous leftist literati, including Jeffers, Martin Flavin, Lewis and the Steffenses, along with theater, dance and art reviews by feminist artists such as Alberta Spratt, Jennie V. Cannon and Roberta Balfour, The Carmelite became one of California’s most controversial publications.  Its illustrations ranged from Weston’s enigmatic photos to the "anarchist" prints of James Blanding Sloan.  The Steffenses also arranged for public exhibits of Europe’s most avant-garde art, including Dada, Surrealism and the paintings of Paul Klee.  Ella wrote on various topics and once reported on the very unusual meeting between the popular Modernist artists John O’Shea and Frederick O’Brien.  The Steffenses' support of the art community extended to their own home where they entertained local painters and offered to display their work.  Ella loved publicity and when two Carmel reactionaries, artist William Silva and writer/editor Perry Newberry, tried to ban her local chapter of the communist-affiliated John Reed Club as well as her "socialist reading room", she made sure that the press as far away as Los Angeles was apprised of the violation of her civil rights.  The Steffenses also joined controversial national campaigns, including the Scottsboro Boys Defense Fund which sought to free nine black men who were still incarcerated after the Supreme Court of the United States twice reversed their convictions for rape.  Lincoln Steffens died in Carmel in 1936.

Publications 
A close associate with the Communist Party USA and strong supporter of the Soviet Union under Stalin, she wrote her first book, Red Virtue, after visiting the Soviet Union in 1932.  She returned to the Soviet Union in 1944 and published I Saw the Russian People the following year.  In her autobiography, And Not to Yield published in 1963, she affirmed her support for the Soviets while admitting that she had concealed negative aspects of the murderous regime.  At the time, she told a friend that she was not part of the "'God that failed' brigade and did not want her book to be of advantage to that group".

Later life
In 1939, Winter married the screenwriter and humorist Donald Ogden Stewart and became stepmother to his sons, Donald and Ames. They lived in California and then in Hampstead, London.

She died of a stroke on 5 August 1980 died at her home in Hamstead, London. She was 82 years old.

Bibliography
 Red Virtue: Human Relations in the New Russia. Harcourt, Brace & Company, New York 1933
 Ella Winter, Granville Hicks (eds.): The Letters of Lincoln Steffens. Harcourt, Brace & Company, New York 1938
 I Saw the Russian People. Little, Brown and Company, Boston 1945
 Ella Winter, Herbert Shapiro (eds.): The World of Lincoln Steffens. 1962
 And Not to Yield: An Autobiography. Harcourt, Brace & World, New York 1963

Notes

External links 

Donald Ogden Stewart and Ella Winter Papers. Yale Collection of American Literature, Beinecke Rare Book and Manuscript Library.

Further reading
 Lying for Truth: Münzenberg & the Comintern (Stephen Koch)

1898 births
1980 deaths
People from Carmel-by-the-Sea, California
Socialist feminists
20th-century British journalists
German emigrants to the United Kingdom